The 2015–16 season is Oldham Athletic's 121st season in their history and 19th consecutive season in League One. Along with competing in League One, the club will also participate in the FA Cup, League Cup and JP Trophy. The season covers the period from 1 July 2015 to 30 June 2016.

The club appointed Sunderland coach Darren Kelly as their new manager following the conclusion of the 2014–15 season. However, Kelly's reign was brief and he was sacked after a 5–1 home defeat to Peterborough United with Oldham having won only one of their first seven league games. Kelly was replaced by David Dunn who he had signed as a player just over a month earlier. However, Dunn himself won only two of his 17 league games and was sacked after a poor run of form during which his team picked up two points from a possible 21. Following Dunn's departure, Oldham turned to former player, coach and manager John Sheridan who was re-appointed as manager less than seven years after being sacked from the role.

Squad statistics

Last updated 30 January 2016
Numbers in parentheses denote appearances as substitute.
Players with squad numbers struck through and marked  left the club during the playing season.
Players with names in italics and marked * were on loan from another club for the whole of their season with Oldham.
Players listed with no appearances have been in the matchday squad but only as unused substitutes.

Transfers

Transfers in

Transfers out

Loans in

Loans out

Competitions

Pre-season friendlies
On 15 May 2015, Oldham Athletic announced they would host Blackburn Rovers in a pre-season friendly on 25 July 2015. Another friendly against Bolton Wanderers was confirmed on 19 May 2015. A day later, Oldham Athletic announced an XI squad would travel to Trafford for pre-season preparations. On 21 May 2015, Oldham Athletic announced they will travel to Carlisle United in a pre-season fixture. On 23 May 2015, Oldham Athletic announced they will travel to FC Halifax Town. On 27 May 2015, Further friendlies were revealed when the club announced their pre-schedule in full.

League One

League table

Matches
On 17 June 2015, the fixtures for the forthcoming season were announced.

FA Cup

League Cup
On 16 June 2015, the first round draw was made, Oldham Athletic were drawn at home against Middlesbrough.

Football League Trophy
On 8 August 2015, live on Soccer AM the draw for the first round of the Football League Trophy was drawn by Toni Duggan and Alex Scott. The Latics will travel to Shrewsbury Town.

References

Oldham Athletic
Oldham Athletic A.F.C. seasons